The Avro 558  was a British single-engined ultralight biplane built by Avro at Hamble Aerodrome.

Design and development
The Avro 558 was designed for the 1923 light aircraft trials for single-seaters at Lympne Aerodrome. Two Avro 558 biplanes were built, they were biplanes powered by motorcycle engines (one with a B&H twin-cylinder air-cooled engine, the second with a 500 cc Douglas engine). The first aircraft was modified with a 698 cc (42.6 in³) Blackburne Tomtit and both had modifications to the landing gear.

Operational history
The aircraft did not win the competition, but the second aircraft went on to establish a world record for its class of aircraft of 13,850 ft (4,222 m) over Lympne on 13 October 1923. It is not known what happened to the two aircraft, not having been reported since 1923.

Operators

Specifications

See also

References

External links
Avro 558 – British Aircraft Directory

1920s British civil utility aircraft
558
Single-engined tractor aircraft
Biplanes
Aircraft first flown in 1923